Elena Vesnina was the defending champion, but lost in the second round to Madison Keys.

Keys went on to win her maiden WTA tour title, defeating Angelique Kerber in the final, 6–3, 3–6, 7–5.

Seeds

Draw

Finals

Top half

Bottom half

Qualifying

Seeds

Qualifiers

Draw

First qualifier

Second qualifier

Third qualifier

Fourth qualifier

References
 Main Draw
 Qualifying Draw

Aegon Internationalandnbsp;- Singles
2014 Women's Singles